Isgandar Khan Khoyski (Azerbaijani: İsgəndər xan Xoyski; September 1819, Nukha (Shaki), Nukha uezd, Elisavetpol Governorate,Russian Empire – , Yelizavetpol, Imperial Russia) was a decorated Imperial Russian and Azerbaijani military commander, having the rank of lieutenant-general.

Background 
Although official documents refer to his birthplace and birthdate as 25 May 1820, Yelisavetpol (Ganja), he was probably born in September 1819 in Nukha to noble Khoyski family. His father was Kalbali Khan Khoyski (also known as Kichik Khan) was a major-general in Imperial Russian Army. His mother Sarabayim was his father's first cousin and a daughter of Jafar Qoli Khan Donboli. He also had a sister.

Education and career 
He was educated at home and entered serving as naib in the Transcaucasian Equestrian Muslim regiment. Next year, for distinction in service, he was promoted to ensign. He took part in the Caucasian War in 1846 and next year he was send to serve as a cornet in the Life Guards. He was promoted to lieutenant in 1850, then to staff rittmeister (1852), to rittmeister (1854) and captain in 1859. Khoyski was promoted to colonel in 1860 with leaving with the Caucasian army. After being promoted to the rank of major general in 1883, he was promoted to lieutenant general in 1889 and sent to retirement.

Death 
While he was still alive, he built a mausoleum for his family in the Sabiskar cemetery in Elisabethpol. His children Jahangir Khan and Tububeyim are buried next to him.

Family 
He was married two times:

 Saadat begüm (1819 - 1892) — daughter of Ismail Khan Khoyski (his uncle)
 Jahangir Khan Khoyski (1849-1894)
 Saltanat begüm (? - 6 January 1869)
 Shahrabanu begüm — daughter of Nukha cleric Haji Molla Zeynal
 Huseyngulu Khan Khoyski
 Tubu begüm Khoyskaya (1871-?)
 Fatali Khan Khoyski
 Abbasqoli Khan Khoyski (1878-?)
 Rustam Khan Khoyski

Awards 

 Order of Saint Anna 3rd class (1849)
 Order of Saint Stanislaus 2nd class (1859)
 Order of Saint Anna 2nd class (1871)
 Order of Saint Vladimir 4th class (1871)
 Insignia of Immaculate Service XL (1887)

References 

1894 deaths
Imperial Russian Army generals
Azerbaijani nobility
Khoyski family
1819 births
Shaki Khanate